This list of compositions by Teresa Carreño provides the earliest known publication date and name of publisher. If a work is unpublished or no published work available, the abbreviation “MS” is used. Carreño composed approximately seventy-five compositions. Most of her compositions were composed between 1860 and 1875, and then sporadically during 1880s and 1890s. Sixty-eight compositions are for solo piano, two known works exist for voice and piano, two works for chorus, and three works for instrumental or orchestral ensemble.

Works for Piano with opus numbers

 Op. 1 Gottschalk Waltz (Boston, 1863)
 Op. 2 Caprice-Polka, Fantasie-Caprice (Paris, c. 1866)
 Op. 3 Reverie-Impromptu, (MS, c. 1866)
 Op. 4 Caprice Étude no 1, (MS, n.d.)
 Op. 5 Une Larme. Impromptu (MS, 1863)
 Op. 6 Caprice-Étude no 2, (MS, n.d.)
 Op. 7 Caprice-Étude no 3, (MS, n.d.)
 Op. 8 Marche Triomphale (Boston, 1873)
 Op. 9 Le corbeille de fleurs. Valse (Paris, c. 1867)
 Op. 10 Souvenir de mon pays. Nocturne, (MS, n.d.)
 Op. 11 Marche Funèbre, (MS, n.d.)
 Op. 12 Prière, (MS, n.d.)
 Op. 13 Polka de concert (Paris, c. 1867)
 Op. 14 Reminiscences de Norma. Fantaisie (Paris, c.1867)
 Op. 15 Ballade (Paris, c.1867)
 Op. 16 Souvenirs de l'Angleterre. Air anglais (c. 1866)
 Op. 17 Plaìntes au bord d'une tombe. Six melodies, no. 1. Plainte! 1re Élégie (Paris, c.1869)
 Op. 18 Plaìntes au bord d'une tombe. Six melodies, no. 2. Partie! 2ème Élégie (Paris, c.1869)
 [Op. 19] Plaìntes au bord d'une tombe. Six melodies, no. 3 (Boston, c. 1873)
 Op. 20 Plaìntes au bord d'une tombe. Six melodies, no. 4. 4ème Élégie, (MS, n.d.)
 Op. 21 Plaìntes au bord d'une tombe. Six melodies, no. 5. 5ème Élégie, (MS, n.d.)
 Op. 22 Plaìntes au bord d'une tombe. Six melodies, no. 6. 6ème Élégie, (MS, n.d.)
 Op. 23 Mazurka. Caprice de concert, (MS, n.d.)
 Op. 24 Fantasie sur l'Africaine de Meyerbeer. Paris: Brandus et S. Dufour (Paris, c. 1868)
 Op. 25 Le printemps. 3ème Valse de Salon (Paris, 1868)
 Op. 26 Un bal en rȇve. Fantasie-Caprice (Paris, c. 1869)
 Op. 27 Une revue à Prague. Caprice de concert (MS) (Paris, c. 1869)
 Op. 28 Un rêve en mer. Étude-Méditation (MS) (Paris, c. 1868)
 Op. 29 Le ruisseau. 1re Étude de salon (Paris, c. 1869)
 Op. 30 Mazurka de salon (Paris, c. 1869)
 Op. 31 Scherzo-Caprice (Paris, c. 1868)
 Op. 33 Esquisses italiennes. No. 1 "Venise," Réverie-Barcarolle (Paris, c. 1870)
 Op. 34 Esquisses italiennes. No. 2 "Florence." Cantilène (Paris, c. 1870)
 Op. 34 Intermezzo-Scherzoso (New York, 1879)
 Op. 35 Le Sommeil de L'Énfant. Berceuse (Paris, c. 1872)
 Op. 35 Polonaise (New York, 1873)
 Op. 36 Scherzino (London, c. 1871)
 Op. 38 Highland. Souvenir d'Écosse. Caprice (Paris, 1872)
 Op. 38 Vals Gayo. (MS, 1910), (Cincinnati, 1919) 
 Op. 39 La fausse note. Fantasie-Valse (Paris, 1872)

Works for Piano without opus numbers

 No. 1 Valse (MS, 1860)
 No. 2 Valse (MS, 1860)
 No. 3 Mazurka (MS, 1860)
 No. 4 Danza (MS, 1860)
 No. 5 Valse (MS, 1860)
 No. 6 Valse (MS, 1860)
 No. 7 Valse (MS, 1860)
 No. 8 Valse (MS, 1860)
 No. 9 Polka (MS, 1861)
 No. 10 Polka (MS, 1861)
 No. 11 Danza (MS, 1861)
 No. 12 Valse (MS, 1861)
 No. 13 Danze (MS, 1861)
 No. 14 Valse (MS, 1861)
 No. 15 Valse (MS, 1861)
 Capricho no. 1 (MS, 1861)
 Capricho no. 2 (MS, 1861)
 Capricho no. 3 (MS, 1861)
 Saludo a Cuba (c. 1863)
 4éme Valse (MS, 1868)
 Danse de gnome (Boston, 1875)
 Sailing in the Twilight (Boston, 1875)
 Kleiner Walzer (Mi Teresita) (MS) (Sydney, c. 1891)
 Étude-mazurka (MS, n.d.)
 La Petite Boiteuse. Caprice (MS, n.d.)
 Preludio (MS, n.d.)
 Valse Mélancholique (MS, n.d.)

Works for Voice and Piano
 Feuillet d'Album. Lamartine. "Le livre de la vie est le libre supreme." (MS, n.d.)
 Movimento de Barcarole. "Voga, voga, la pallida luna gia rischiara.” (MS, n.d.)

Works for Chorus
 Hymno [Himno] a Bolivar (MS, c. 1883)
 Himno al ilustre Americano (c. 1886)

Instrumental or Orchestral Works
 Romance pour Violon avec accompagnement de Piano (MS, n.d.)
 Serenade for String Orchestra (MS, 1895)
 String Quartet, B minor (Allegro, Andante, Scherzo: Allegro ma non troppo, Allegro risoluto) (MS, c. 1895), (Leipzig, 1896)

Missing or Lost Works
 Op. 40 Stacatto-Capriccieto (New York: Schuberth, n.d.)

References

External links 
 A finding aid to the Teresa Carreño Papers, 1862-1991 at Vassar College, Archives and Special Collections Library can be accessed online.

Carreño, Teresa